State elections were held in East Germany on 15 October 1950. They were the last state elections in the country, as the states were dissolved in 1952.

Voters were presented with a single list from the Socialist Unity Party of Germany-dominated National Front, which they could only approve or reject. The seat allocation in each of the state parliaments was agreed in advance between the constituent parties and mass organizations of the Front.

Results

Summary

By state

References

Bibliography 
Richard Schachtner, 1956: Die deutschen Nachkriegswahlen: Wahlergebnisse in der Bundesrepublik Deutschland, in den deutschen Bundesländern, in West-Berlin, im Saarland und in der Sowjetzone (DDR) 1946–1956. Munich: Isar-Verlag. pages 77–78.
Günter Braun, 1990: Wahlen und Abstimmungen; en: Martin Broszat y Hermann Weber: SBZ-Handbuch. Oldenburg. pages 397, 396 and 418.
Herbert Gottwald, 1994: Der Thüringer Landtag 1946–1952. Jena: Landtag of Thuringia in association with the Wartburg Verlag. page 56.
Kurt Adamy/Kristina Hübener, 1999: Kleine Geschichte des Brandenburger Landtages. Potsdam: Brandenburgische Landeszentrale für politische Bildung, page 169. 

Elections in East Germany
East Germany
Elections in Mecklenburg-Western Pomerania
Elections in Saxony
Elections in Saxony-Anhalt
Elections in Thuringia
Elections in Brandenburg
1950 elections in Germany